Henry Davis Ross (September 12, 1861February 9, 1945) was an American jurist and politician. Before his election to the Arizona Supreme Court, he served as county attorney for both Coconino and Yavapai counties as well as a member of the Arizona Territorial Legislature. Following Arizona statehood, he served on the state's highest bench for 33 years and was selected chief justice on six occasions. Ross served the longest tenure in the court's history while his brother, John Wilson Ross, served the shortest.

Biography
Ross was born on September 12, 1861, to Emily (Terrell) and William Henry Ross in Berryville, Arkansas. He grew up on his family's farm while attending the nearby Clark's Academy. Ross attended the University of Iowa and graduated with a Bachelor of Laws in 1883.

After graduation, Ross taught at a school in Arkansas before moving to Flagstaff, Arizona Territory in 1886. He continued to teach for another two years in Arizona.  Among his students was future United States Senator Henry F. Ashurst.

Admission to the bar led Ross to begin practicing law in Flagstaff and Prescott. He married Margaret Wheeler of El Paso, Texas, on April 24, 1890. The marriage produced two sons, Henry David, Jr and John Wheeler.

Ross joined the Prescott legal firm of Ross & O'Sullivan in 1894, a partnership he continued until his ascension to the bench. He was elected to a two-year term as Yavapai County attorney in 1888. At the end of his term, Ross became county attorney for the newly created Coconino county. He then represented Coconino County as a member of the House during the 17th Arizona Territorial Legislature. Following his term in the legislature, he became Register for Prescott's land office. He won election for two more terms as Yavapai County attorney, in 1896 and 1908.

Promotion to the Arizona Supreme Court came to Ross on February 14, 1912. He won reelection to the post several times and held a seat on the court until his death. During his time on the court, Ross was noted for his work effort, averaging 50 decisions a year over a five-year period at a time when a justice of the Supreme Court of the United States averaged ten to twelve rulings a year. In January 1945, Ross informed friends that he intended to retire at the end of his final term in January 1947.

Ross died on February 9, 1945, following a stroke. The stroke occurred 8 days prior to his death and Ross failed to recover consciousness  in the intervening time. He was buried at Phoenix's Greenwood Memorial Park.

References

 
 
 

1861 births
1945 deaths
Burials in Arizona
Justices of the Arizona Supreme Court
Members of the Arizona Territorial Legislature
Arizona Territory officials
People from Berryville, Arkansas
Chief Justices of the Arizona Supreme Court